The men's decathlon at the 2015 World Championships in Athletics was held at the Beijing National Stadium on 28 and 29 August.

The overwhelming favorite here had to be the World Record Holder, Olympic Champion and defending Champion, Ashton Eaton. This was Eaton's first decathlon of the year. American Trey Hardee entered as the world leader.   Pan American Games and Commonwealth Games champion and returning bronze medalist Damian Warner and returning silver medalist and Götzis winner Michael Schrader were also medal contenders.

Eaton won the first event, the 100 metres in 10.23, a World Championship Decathlon best and #139 in the world, but slightly off world record pace.  Warner, Rico Freimuth, and Felipe Dos Santos were right behind him in that fourth heat.  In the long jump, again Eaton led, his 7.88 slightly off world record pace and behind his seasonal best but still equal to the #93 jump in the world.  Schrader was the second best jumper of the day but Dos Santos held on to third place.

Freimuth took over third place by winning the shot put in 15.50, Eaton's 14.52 a foot improvement over world record pace.  A 2.10 high jump moved Kurt Felix into third position, while Eaton's 2.01 lost a little ground to the world record.

In the 400 metres, Eaton set a World Decathlon Best at 45.00 seconds.  It was equal to the #34 time in the world.  This was Eaton's third World Decathlon Best after the 100 metres and Long Jump he set during his world record in Eugene in 2012.  The 400 was also a 1.70 second improvement over his world record pace.  Freimuth moved back into third place.

At the end of the first day, Eaton held a 173-point advantage over Warner, with three Germans, Freimuth, Kai Kazmirek and Schrader bunched behind.

The second day began with Warner running the 110 metres hurdles in 13.63, equal to the #100 time in the world, with Eaton right with him in 13.69 (#110 in the world) and Freimuth next in the same race. Eaton only gained .01 over record pace.

Freimuth won the discus with a 50.17, Eaton's 43.34 gained a half a metre on the world record.  Eaton's 5.20 pole vault lost 10 cm to the world record, Ilya Shkurenyov used the same height to move up to fourth place.  But the world record became a possibility when Eaton's 63.63 season best improved almost 5 meters on his world record pace.  Simply a solid 1500 metres could do it.

In the 1500, Eaton had a perfect pace set by Larbi Bourrada who was in the process of setting the African Record, tying up at the end he crossed in 4:17.52, 3 seconds slower than Eugene but good enough for a 6-point world record improvement.  350 points behind, Warner improved upon his Canadian Record for silver.  Freimuth continued to the bronze, Bouraada got fifth place with his record and in eighth place Felix improved his Grenadian National Record.

Records
Prior to the competition, the records were as follows:

Qualification standards

Schedule

Results

100 metres
The 100 metres was held on 28 August at 09:00.

Long jump
The long jump was held on 28 August at 10:05.

Shot put
The shot put was held on 28 August at 11:55.

High jump
The high jump was held on 28 August at 16:15.

400 metres
The 400 metres was held on 28 August at 20:20.

110 metres hurdles
The 110 metres hurdles was held on 29 August at 09:00.

Discus throw
The discus throw was held on 29 August at 10:05.

Pole vault
The pole vault was held on 29 August at 13:15.

Javelin throw
The javelin throw was held on 29 August at 17:00.

1500 metres
The 1500 metres was held on 29 August at 20:10.

Final standings
After all events.

References

Decathlon
Decathlon at the World Athletics Championships